The 2016–17 Scottish Premiership (known as the Ladbrokes Premiership for sponsorship reasons) was the fourth season of the Scottish Premiership, the highest division of Scottish football. The fixtures were published on 17 June 2016. The season began on 6 August 2016. Celtic were the defending champions.

Twelve teams contested the league: Aberdeen, Celtic, Dundee, Hamilton Academical, Heart of Midlothian, Inverness CT, Kilmarnock, Motherwell, Partick Thistle, Rangers, Ross County and St Johnstone.

On 2 April 2017, Celtic won their sixth consecutive title and 48th overall after a 5-0 win away to Hearts, with eight matches still to play and would go on to complete the season unbeaten.

Teams
The following teams have changed division since the 2015–16 season.

To Premiership
Promoted from Scottish Championship
 Rangers

From Premiership
Relegated to Scottish Championship
 Dundee United

Stadia and locations

Personnel and kits

Managerial changes

a.Initially interim, made permanent 15 March 2017

Format

In the initial phase of the season, each of the twelve teams play the other eleven teams three times. After 33 rounds, the league splits into two sections, a top six and a bottom six, with each team playing all the other teams in their section once. The league attempts to balance the fixture list so that teams in the same section have played each other twice at home and twice away, but sometimes this is impossible. A total of 228 matches will be played, with 38 matches played by each team.

League summary

League table

Positions by round
The table lists the positions of teams after each week of matches. In order to preserve chronological progress, any postponed matches are not included in the round at which they were originally scheduled, but added to the full round they were played immediately afterwards. For example, if a match is scheduled for matchday 13, but then postponed and played between days 16 and 17, it will be added to the standings for day 16.

Source: BBC Sport

Results

Matches 1–22
Teams play each other twice, once at home and once away.

Matches 23–33
Teams play every other team once (either at home or away).

Matches 34–38
After 33 matches, the league splits into two sections of six teams i.e. the top six and the bottom six, with the teams playing every other team in their section once (either at home or away). The exact matches are determined by the position of the teams in the league table at the time of the split.

Top six

Bottom six

Season statistics

Top scorers

Hat-tricks

Notes
(H) – Home ; (A) – Away
4 Player scored 4 goals

Awards

Premiership play-offs
The quarter-final was contested between the 3rd and 4th placed teams (Dundee United and Greenock Morton) in the Scottish Championship. After defeating Greenock Morton 5–1 over two legs, Dundee United advanced to the semi-finals to face the 2nd placed team (Falkirk) in the Championship. Dundee United progressed to the play-off final following a 4–3 aggregate victory, but then lost 1–0 on aggregate to Hamilton Academical in the final. Hamilton therefore retained their place in the Premiership for the 2017–18 season.

Quarter-final

First leg

Second leg

Semi-final

First leg

Second leg

Final

First leg

Second leg

Attendances

These are the average attendances of the teams.

See also
Nine in a row

References

External links
Official website 

Scottish Premiership seasons
1
1
Scot